Walter C. Ramsay (August 15, 1878 – February 9, 1928) was an American politician and newspaper editor who served as the 15th secretary of state of Iowa from 1919 to 1929.

Early life 
Born in Ford County, Illinois, Ramsay attended public schools in Paxton, Illinois and Owatonna High School in Owatonna, Minnesota.

Career 
In 1900, Ramsey and his brother purchased the Iowa Valley Press in Belmond, Iowa. In 1924, Ramsay and his brother purchased the Belmond Herald, which later become the Belmond Herald-Press. He served as assistant clerk for the Iowa General Assembly from 1904 to 1906. He then was appointed postmaster of Belmond, Iowa in 1906 and served until 1914. From 1914 to 1918, Ramsay served as mayor of Belmond. He also served as chief clerk for the Iowa General Assembly from 1915 to 1919. In 1919, Ramsay was appointed Iowa secretary of state and served until his death in 1928. He was a Republican.

Death 
Ramsay died from a stroke at his home in Des Moines, Iowa.

Notes

People from Ford County, Illinois
People from Wright County, Iowa
Editors of Iowa newspapers
Iowa Republicans
Mayors of places in Iowa
Secretaries of State of Iowa
Journalists from Illinois
1878 births
1928 deaths
People from Des Moines, Iowa
Iowa postmasters